Soft Spot is the fourth studio album by alt-country band Clem Snide. It was released in 2003 on spinART.

Track listing
"Forever, Now and Then"
"Tuesday, October 24th"
"All Green"
"Close the Door"
"Action"
"Find Love"
"There Is Nothing"
"Strong Enough"
"Happy Birthday"
"Fontanelle"
"Every Moment"

Production
The album was produced by Joe Chiccarelli.

Personnel
 Eef Barzelay - Vocals, acoustic & Electric guitar, lead guitar on "Every Moment"
 Jason Glasser — cello/keyboards 
 Eric Paull — drummer 
 Pete Fitzpatrick — guitar
 Brendan Fitzpatrick (Pete's cousin) — bass
 Mary Roul — violin 
 Mary Olive Smith — vocals 
 Andrew Innis — saxophone

References

2003 albums
Clem Snide albums
SpinART Records albums
Albums produced by Joe Chiccarelli